The 2016 term of the Supreme Court of the United States began October 3, 2016, and concluded October 1, 2017. The table below illustrates which opinion was filed by each justice in each case and which justices joined each opinion.

Table key

2016 term opinions

2016 term membership and statistics
This was the twelfth term of Chief Justice Roberts's tenure and the first term for Justice Gorsuch. The Court began its term with a vacant seat because the Senate had not yet confirmed a replacement for Justice Antonin Scalia following his death on February 13, 2016. The seat was eventually filled by Neil Gorsuch on April 7, 2017.

References

 

Lists of United States Supreme Court opinions by term